Illyria is a genus of cicadas in the family Cicadidae. There are at least four described species in Illyria.

Species
These four species belong to the genus Illyria:
 Illyria australensis (Kirkaldy, 1909) c g
 Illyria burkei (Distant, 1882) c g
 Illyria hilli (Ashton, 1914) c g
 Illyria major Moulds, 1985 c g
 Illyria viridis Moulds, 2022
Data sources: i = ITIS, c = Catalogue of Life, g = GBIF, b = Bugguide.net

References

Further reading

 
 
 
 

Macrotristriini
Cicadidae genera